Amedeo Trilli (9 July 1906 – 30 November 1971) was an Italian film and television actor.

Life and career 
Born in Ronciglione, Viterbo, at very young age Trilli worked as a circus artist, then in 1922 he studied performance at the Accademia di Santa Cecilia and later he started working on stage. He made his film debut in the early days of the sound films, and from the 1940s his presence on the big screen became continuous. One of the most active character actors in Italian genre cinema, Trilli also got some leading roles in a number of low budget films, sometimes credited as Amedeo Novelli.

Selected filmography 
 Pergolesi (1932)
 La Wally (1932)
 Princess Tarakanova (1938)
 Cardinal Messias (1939)
 The Two Tigers (1941)
 Document Z-3 (1942) 
 The Gorgon (1942)
 A Little Wife (1943)
 The Ten Commandments (1945)
 Turri il bandito (1950)
 Father's Dilemma (1950)
 Il richiamo nella tempesta (1950)
 The Cliff of Sin (1950)
 Destiny (1951)
 Tomorrow Is Another Day (1951)
 The Bandit of Tacca Del Lupo (1952)
 Il prezzo dell'onore (1952)
 Guilt Is Not Mine (1952)
 Frontier Wolf (1952)
 Francis the Smuggler (1953)
 Peppino e la vecchia signora (1954)
 Disowned (1954)
 Serenata a Maria (1957)
 Revolt of the Mercenaries (1961)
 Hawk of the Caribbean (1962)
 I diavoli di Spartivento (1963)
 Revolt of the Praetorians (1964)
 Giant of the Evil Island (1965)
 Serafino (1968)

References

External links  
 
 

1906 births 
1971 deaths 
20th-century Italian male actors
Italian male film actors
Italian male stage actors 
People from the Province of Viterbo
Accademia Nazionale di Santa Cecilia alumni